TK Telekom ex Telekomunikacja Kolejowa is a Polish telecommunications company, belonging to the PKP Group.

It is responsible for telecommunications and data transmission for the Polish railways and also serves a number of other companies outside the PKP Group and individual clients. Because of the nature of the services it provides, Telekomunikacja Kolejowa has been designated by Poland as a company of special strategic interest.

The company was founded following the division of the national rail operator Polskie Koleje Państwowe into several dozen separate companies in order to satisfy European Union requirements.

See also 
 Transportation in Poland
 List of railway companies
 Polish locomotives designation

Railway companies of Poland
PKP Group companies
Telecommunications companies of Poland
Polish Limited Liability Companies